The Belgian Democratic Union (Union Démocratique Belge, Belgische Democratische Unie or UDB) was a short-lived political party in Belgium after the Second World War.

History

Formation
The UDB was one of two post-war parties founded in Belgium appealing to Christian thought, the other being the Christian Social Party (PSC-CVP), heir to the prewar Catholic Party. The UDB's main founders were Pierre Clerdent and Antoine Delfosse and the party essentially originated in the French-speaking Christian workers' movement, being unable to gain major supporters from among the Flemish Christian workers' movement.

The UDB was essentially a "labourist" (travailliste) party (which would now be placed on the centre-left) and was much keener on secularisation (déconfessionnalisation) and progress (progressisme) than the PSC-CVP, wishing to bring those of all philosophical and religious persuasions under one flag. It had ambitions to be a nationwide party, but was mainly restricted to Wallonia and the French-speakers in Brussels, making it short on influence in the capital's political circles. Its leaders came from the Belgian resistance and the other parties hoped that the UDB and CVP would compete against and weaken each other by splitting the Christian vote. When the PSC-CVP refused to participate in the second government of Achiel Van Acker (2 August 1945 - 9 January 1946), two UDB members of parliament joined it - Marcel Gregoire for Justice and Jacques Basyn for Defence. Franz De Voghel (with UDB sympathies) was minister of finance.

Fall
UDB hopes were high at the general elections on 17 February 1946, but these were disappointed, with the party only gaining 51,095 votes (mainly in Brussels) and only managed to elect one person to the Chamber of Representatives (Paul M. G. Lévy for the arrondissement of Nijvel, though he resigned after only a few weeks and replaced by Werner Marchand). It was clear that the party had several leaders but no members. In 1946 it had 2,637 members - 380 in Flanders, 904 in Brabant (Brussels) and 1353 in Wallonia. This marked its end.

Some of its leaders went over to the CVP, including Pierre Clerdent (governor of Luxembourg and Liège and later a liberal senator), Alfred Califice (frequently a minister for the CVP) and Antoine Delfosse (for whom this meant a switch back to the CVP). Lévy, Max Bastin and Jacques Basyn became independents.

Further reading

  Wilfried BEERTEN, Ontstaan en ontwikkeling van een politieke beweging: Union démocratique belge, Leuven, 1983
  Wilfried BEERTEN, Le rêve travailliste en Belgique : histoire de l'U.D.B., 1944-1947, translated into Dutch by Maurice Galderoux, Brussel, 1990.
  David LEVAUX, Liège et l'Union Démocratique Belge, graduate thesis, Liège, 2001.

External links
Union Démocratique Belge at Belgium-WWII (Cegesoma)

Defunct political parties in Belgium
Belgian Resistance
1945 establishments in Belgium
1946 disestablishments in Belgium
Political parties established in 1945
Political parties disestablished in 1946
Catholic political parties
Christian socialist organizations